Le Boisle is a commune in the Somme department in Hauts-de-France in northern France.

Geography
The commune lies in the valley of the river Authie and is traversed by the D928. The near neighbouring commune is Labroye.

Demography

See also
Communes of the Somme department

References

Communes of Somme (department)